Cosmopterix sibirica is a moth of the family Cosmopterigidae. It is known from the South Siberian Mountains, Mongolia and Finland.

The wingspan is 11–13 mm. Adults have been recorded in July.

References

sibirica